Juan Martín Pietravallo (born December 7, 1981) is an Argentine footballer.

Career
Pietravallo started his career at Vélez Sársfield, where he made his first appearance in the Clausura 2000 tournament. He played for Vélez until he moved to Olimpo in 2002. In 2003, he played for CD Leganés in Spain, but returned to Argentina to play for Gimnasia La Plata in 2004. In 2005, he joined Atlético de Rafaela and was a key player in the midfield leading the club to the promotion playoffs, where they fell short of reaching the Argentine first division being defeated by Argentinos Juniors.

Following his successful stay at Rafaela he returned to the first division joining Quilmes where he played until mid-2006. During the 2006–07 season he played for Nueva Chicago and then joined Belgrano during the second semester of 2007.
From January 2008 to July 2008 he played in Greece's highest professional football league for Veria.

Following a brief stay in the Greek top flight, Pietravallo was signed by New York Red Bulls of Major League Soccer during the summer 2008 transfer window, but was released on June 26, 2009, having made just 16 MLS appearances for the New York club.

Statistics

Honors

New York Red Bulls
Major League Soccer Western Conference Championship (1): 2008

References

External links
 Juan Martín Pietravallo – Argentine Primera statistics at Fútbol XXI  
 
 
 

1981 births
Living people
Argentine footballers
Argentine expatriate footballers
Footballers from Buenos Aires
Club Atlético Vélez Sarsfield footballers
Club de Gimnasia y Esgrima La Plata footballers
Atlético de Rafaela footballers
Olimpo footballers
Quilmes Atlético Club footballers
Nueva Chicago footballers
Club Atlético Belgrano footballers
CD Leganés players
New York Red Bulls players
Veria F.C. players
FBC Melgar footballers
S.C. Olhanense players
Super League Greece players
Primeira Liga players
Argentine Primera División players
Peruvian Primera División players
Major League Soccer players
Expatriate footballers in Spain
Expatriate footballers in Portugal
Expatriate footballers in Greece
Expatriate footballers in Peru
Expatriate footballers in Venezuela
Expatriate soccer players in the United States
Association football midfielders